Eleftheriou Venizelou Square is a square in the city of Heraklion in Crete, named after the Cretan statesman Eleftherios Venizelos. It dates back to the Venetian era and is more commonly known as Lions Square or Leonton Square (genitive), after the Venetian-era Morosini Fountain (popularly called "τα Λιοντάρια", "The Lions") in its midst, which features four lions supporting the main basin.

Gallery

Sources 
 Lions Square, at explorecrete.com

Squares in Greece
Heraklion
Buildings and structures in Crete
Kingdom of Candia